The 2020 UK & Ireland Greyhound Racing Year is the 95th year of greyhound racing in the United Kingdom and Ireland.

The year was best known for the major disruption caused by the COVID-19 pandemic. The 2020 English Greyhound Derby was postponed and the Arena Racing Company tracks announced a behind closed doors policy from 24 March. ARC's rivals SIS took advantage of the horse racing cancellations by increasing its own schedule by an extra 54 races per week to 532 in total. Henlow increased to eight meetings per week. Racing in Ireland was seriously affected with the industry banning the public from attending meetings. The Irish Greyhound Board (IGB) enforced the ban from Thursday 12 March, with racing continuing with a behind closed doors policy.

The situation worsened and following increased government restrictions all betting shops were closed from March and the open race calendar was suspended, meaning that only graded racing would take place until further notice. Following further announcements by the Prime Minister Boris Johnson on 23 March racing in the UK was suspended and this was followed by Ireland the following day. The industry united with many tracks announcing financial help for every racing and retired greyhound attached to their track, the payments were in addition to the financial help pledged by the Greyhound Board of Great Britain (GBGB).

When trials returned (18 May) following the lock-down Peterborough announced that they would not be re-opening until they sought further clarification from the GBGB. The concerns over the financial implication of racing behind closed doors was evident and the following day (20 May) the Perkins family announced the permanent closure of the track.  Although UK racing finally returned on 1 June (at Perry Barr) it was behind closed doors and both Poole Stadium and Belle Vue Stadium remained closed with the possibility of not re-opening being a serious consideration. Then on 1 August, Belle Vue announced that it had closed for good and this was followed by Poole on 22 September. Three tracks had now closed permanently, two of them as a consequence of the pandemic.

As 2020 came to a close the pandemic continued to dramatically affect the industry with no immediate sign of crowds being allowed to return. One positive consequence of the pandemic was that many homing organisations including the Lincolnshire, Suffolk and Portsmouth Greyhound Trusts were reporting that all retired greyhounds were being homed and that there was a shortage. The shortage was caused by a combination of higher demand for pets and less race tracks, however concerns were raised that if the shortage of retired greyhounds continued it could force some homing organisations to close.

Roll of honour

Summary
News not dominated by the COVID-19 pandemic included the Belle Vue Stadium scenario. Following the demise of the GRA in 2019 the industry waited for imminent closure of Belle Vue Stadium. The first track to be built in the United Kingdom (1926) had been approved for housing planning permission and awaited the official closure date. The stadium remained closed when racing returned following the virus ban, the economical impact of racing behind closed doors was quoted and then permanent closure was confirmed on 1 August.

The Arena Racing Company (ARC) became the UK's largest greyhound racing operator following the purchase of Nottingham Greyhound Stadium from Nottingham Greyhound Stadium Ltd.

2020 was noticeable for the continued recent trend of Irish greyhounds out performing their British opposition, a fact highlighted during the 2020 English Derby. Despite a reduced Irish entry, four greyhounds made the final for the second year in a row and third time in the history of the competition (2016, 2019 and 2020). The Irish duly won both of the sport's premier events with Deerjet Sydney taking the English Derby and Newinn Taylor winning the Irish Derby.

Patrick Janssens won his maiden Trainer of the Year title ending the eight-year reign of Mark Wallis. Wallis gained some compensation when his marathon star Aayamza Royale (a black bitch) won the 2020 Greyhound of the Year award, held as a virtual event in February 2021, due to the lockdown that was in place as a consequence of COVID-19.

News
The sport lost two of its most famous names when trainers George Curtis and Ernie Gaskin both died, Gentleman George as he was known died on 17 April  and Gaskin died on 24 February.

Towcester Greyhound Stadium due to re-open on 20 March with a trial session had to wait until the end of the Coronavirus before finally opening with a trial session on 22 May. The GBGB expressed its disappointment with the Greyhound Trust in an open letter, the Trust was reportedly on the verge of insolvency following a move to new offices that has cost somewhere in the region of £1.7 million. The GBGB were upset at the money used for new offices and argued that the money should have gone to re-homing greyhounds and warned that they could divert their £1.3 million funding to other homing areas. Leading performer Ice on Fire was retired following an unsuccessful attempt to return from injury, the decision came after a September trial for the Derby.

Ireland
The Easter Cup was run behind closed doors and Wolfe made amends for his 2019 English Greyhound Derby problems by claiming the event for trainer Graham Holland. The quality of the competition was high with two Derby champions Priceless Blake and Ballyanne Sim both being eliminated in the semi finals. After the lockdown the Champion Stakes attracted a superb entry which resulted in a shock win for Pestana, the blue brindle dog's fast break was the decisive factor for winning the event. Derby champion Lenson Bocko had a bad start and encountered trouble in the final that included three Liam Dowling runners.

A new star was seen in the final of the Larry O'Rourke National Produce, Newinn Taylor won his 12th successive race, the May 2018 whelp provided his trainer Graham Holland a third Produce champion in five years and then headed for the Irish Derby which he went on to win as well. Unfortunately during the Race of Champions night on 5 December, at Shelbourne Park, Newinn Taylor broke down after suffering a serious injury and the very next race on the card saw Lenson Bocko win his farewell race. The two Derby champions were retired and sent to stud by trainer Graham Holland.

The Social Democrat party campaigned to withdraw funding to greyhound racing but it came under criticism after it transpired that the abandoned greyhounds used part of the campaign to discredit the industry were found to be a lurcher and whippet (the latter from Denmark). The bill was defeated on the first motion vote.

Newinn Taylor was named Irish Greyhound of the Year.

Competitions
The current Greyhound of the Year Ice On Fire continued his good form by winning the Juvenile at Sheffield. The revised schedule of racing after COVID-19 lockdown resulted in a strange calendar events because of the rearranged English and Irish Derby competitions. Kilara Lion won the East Anglian Derby but no greyhound had won more than one major event in England going into the delayed Derby. However, after the Derby had finished Kilara Lion won the Kent Derby in November, winning the final by over 6 lengths.

Smallmead trained by John Mullins had won both the Champion Stakes and St Leger by December and looked like a serious contender for greyhound of the year but suffered a major setback when a positive sample was returned which resulted in him being stripped of the Champion Stakes title. The Champion Stakes title was handed to runner-up Desperado Dan. The greyhound of the year title would go to the Mark Wallis trained Aayamza Royale following two major successes towards the latter part of the year. After winning the returning Cesarewitch in September she went on to win the Coral TV Trophy in December.

Principal UK finals

Principal Irish finals

UK Category 1 & 2 competitions

Irish feature competitions

+ Cancelled due to COVID-19 pandemic.

References 

Greyhound racing in the United Kingdom
Greyhound racing in the Republic of Ireland
UK and Ireland Greyhound Racing Year
UK and Ireland Greyhound Racing Year
UK
UK and Ireland